Luganega (also luganiga, luganica or lucanica) is an Italian fresh sausage made with pork; it is a traditional food from Lombardy, Veneto and northern Italy and is usually rolled up to appear like a snail.

Luganega is part of the risotto alla monzese (Monza-style risotto), a variant of risotto alla milanese, can be used in barbecues or in rich stews together with mushrooms or potatoes.

It has a few variations: in the richest one pork is united with Grana Padano, Marsala wine and broth.

Notes

Fresh sausages
Cuisine of Lombardy